Daniel Nestor and Nenad Zimonjić were the defending champions, but decided not to participate together.
Zimonjić played alongside Michaël Llodra, but lost to Marcel Granollers and Tommy Robredo in the second round.
Nestor partnered up with Max Mirnyi, but they were eliminated by Rohan Bopanna and Aisam-ul-Haq Qureshi in the quarterfinals.
Bob Bryan and Mike Bryan won the title, defeating Juan Ignacio Chela and Bruno Soares 6–3, 6–2 in the finals.

Seeds
All seeds received a bye into the second round.

Draw

Finals

Top half

Bottom half

References
 Main Draw

Monte-Carlo Rolex Masters - Doubles
2011 Monte-Carlo Rolex Masters